Derick Theodoro Santos Poloni (born 1 September 1993) is a Brazilian professional footballer who plays as a left-back for Casa Pia.

Professional career
Poloni is a youth product of the Brazilian clubs São Paulo, before moving to Portugal with Académica in 2013. He began his senior career with Sourense in the Portuguese third division in 2014. The following year, he moved to Anadia where he stayed for a couple of years. In 2017, he moved to the professional club Leixões in the LigaPro. In 2018, he was scouted by English Premier League club Arsenal. On 1 October 2020 he transferred to Casa Pia, and helped them achieve promotion to the Primeira Liga for the 2022-23 season.

References

External links
 

1993 births
Living people
Brazilian footballers
Association football fullbacks
G.D. Sourense players
Anadia F.C. players
Leixões S.C. players
Casa Pia A.C. players
Primeira Liga players
Liga Portugal 2 players
Campeonato de Portugal (league) players
Brazilian expatriate footballers
Brazilian expatriates in Portugal
Expatriate footballers in Portugal